Konyshyovsky District is an administrative and municipal district (raion), one of the twenty-eight in Kursk Oblast, Russia. It is located in the northwestern central part of the oblast. Its administrative center is the urban locality (a work settlement) of Konyshyovka. Population:  15,155 (2002 Census);  The population of Konyshyovka accounts for 42.7% of the district's total population.

Geography
Konyshyovsky District is located in the northwest region of Kursk Oblast. The terrain is hilly plain in the north and south, with more desiccating ravines in the east. The district lies on the Orel-Kursk plateau of the Central Russian Upland. The main river in the district is the Svapa River, in the Dnieper River basin. The administrative center is the town of Konyshyovka.

The district is bordered on the north by Dmitriyevsky District, on the east by Fatezhsky District, on the south by Lgovsky District, and on the west by Khomutovsky District.

References

Notes

Sources

External links
Konyshyovsky District on Google Maps
Konyshyovsky District on OpenStreetMap

Districts of Kursk Oblast